Albanian Cycling Federation (FSHÇ) is the main national governing body for cycle sport in Albania. FSHÇ is a member of the Union Cycliste Internationale (UCI) and Union Européenne de Cyclisme (UET).

See also 
List of Albanian cyclists
Sports in Albania
Tour of Albania
Balkan Elite Road Classics

References 

Cycle racing organizations
Cycling
Sports organizations established in 1925
1925 establishments in Albania